The sexual abuse scandal in Honolulu diocese is a significant chapter in the series of Catholic sex abuse cases in the United States and Ireland.

Accusations against clergy
In 1989, Joseph Anthony Ferrario became the first bishop to be publicly accused of sexual misconduct in the United States. The bishop's accuser was David Figueroa, a cook living in Florida who has tested HIV-positive. He made charges against Ferrario anonymously in 1989 and went public on Geraldo Rivera's TV show in 1990. 

The Supreme Court of Hawaii ruled that a statute of limitation effectively prevented his prosecution. Ferrario maintained his innocence for the rest of his life.

One plaintiff won $3.5 million (reduced to $1.04 million on appeal) in the case of Thomas Adamson. Allegations against Adamson spanned 22 years, but two Catholic dioceses kept shuttling him into new assignments.

Reverend Mr. James "Ron" Gonsalves was the administrator of Saint Ann Roman Catholic Church in Waihee, Maui, and pleaded guilty on May 17, 2006 to several counts of sexual assault on a 12-year-old male. Bishop Clarence Richard Silva has permanently withdrawn his faculties and has initiated laicization proceedings against Gonsalves with the Congregation for the Doctrine of the Faith.

Bishop DiLorenzo is often credited with creating the first zero tolerance policy on allegations of sexual abuse at the hands of priests — a policy that came about well before the Catholic sex abuse scandals that plagued the rest of the nation in the early 2000s (decade).

References

Catholic Church sexual abuse scandals in the United States
Incidents of violence against boys
Violence against children